George Shepherd (23 April 1938 – 19 May 2022) was a Canadian hurdler. He competed in the men's 400 metres hurdles at the 1960 Summer Olympics.

References

1938 births
2022 deaths
Athletes (track and field) at the 1960 Summer Olympics
Canadian male hurdlers
Olympic track and field athletes of Canada
Athletes (track and field) at the 1958 British Empire and Commonwealth Games
Athletes (track and field) at the 1959 Pan American Games
Athletes (track and field) at the 1962 British Empire and Commonwealth Games
Commonwealth Games competitors for Canada
Track and field athletes from Ontario
People from Port Colborne
Pan American Games track and field athletes for Canada